Shahrag (Persian: شهرگ; also spelled Shahrak) was an Iranian aristocrat, who served as the governor of Pars during the Arab invasion of Iran. 

He is first mentioned in 644, when he defeated the Arab military leader al-Ala'a Al-Hadrami near Estakhr. Some time later, Uthman ibn Abi al-As established a military base at Tawwaj, and shortly after defeated and killed Shahrag near Rew-shahr (however other sources states that it was Shahrak's brother who killed him).

Sources
 
 
 
 
 

644 deaths
Year of birth unknown
Generals of Yazdegerd III
Governors of Fars
Governors of the Sasanian Empire
7th-century Iranian people